Kalmar Airport , branded as Kalmar Öland Airport, is an airport in southeastern Sweden. The airport is located only some 5 kilometers west of downtown Kalmar. The airfield was originally the home of the Kalmar Wing (F 12). It is owned and operated by Kalmar Municipality.

Airlines and destinations
The following airlines operate regular scheduled and charter flights at Kalmar Airport:

Statistics

See also
Transport in Sweden
List of the largest airports in the Nordic countries

External links
Kalmar Airport official site

References

Airports in Sweden
Buildings and structures in Kalmar County
Kalmar
International airports in Sweden